Football in Canada may refer to:
Canadian football, a version of gridiron football played almost exclusively in Canada
Professional football in Canada
Soccer in Canada, association football in the country

See also 
 List of gridiron football teams in Canada